Verónica Natalia Páez (born April 17, 1974) is a female marathon runner from Argentina who is a two-time winner of the Buenos Aires Marathon in her native country (2003 and 2004). She twice won the Argentine title in the women's marathon, both times in Santa Rosa (2003 and 2005).

Achievements
All results regarding marathon, unless stated otherwise

References
 ARRS

1974 births
Living people
Argentine female marathon runners
Athletes (track and field) at the 2004 Summer Olympics
Olympic athletes of Argentina
Place of birth missing (living people)
21st-century Argentine women